S. Ramesan (16 February 1952 – 13 January 2022) was an Indian Malayalam language poet, orator and literary activist from Kerala. He received several awards including the Kerala Sahitya Akademi Award and Asan Memorial Poetry Prize.

Biography
S. Ramesan was born in Vaikom in the Kottayam District, on 16 February 1952. He started writing poems during his childhood. He had his primary education at St. Joseph LP School, Palliprathussery and Govt Boys High School, Vaikom. After that he studied at St. Michael's College, Cherthala, Maharaja's College, Ernakulam and Ernakulam Law College. In 1972, he became the first student union chairman of Students' Federation of India at Maharaja's College. Ramesan joined Kerala government service as Block Development Officer (BDO) in 1981 and retired as Additional Development Commissioner in 2007. He previously worked at State Bank of Travancore also.

He was the State Vice President of the Purogamana Kala Sahitya Sangham (Progressive Art Literary Society). He has served as state secretary of Purogamana Kala Sahithya Sangam, Director of the Sahithya Pravarthaka Sahakarana Sangam (Literary Working Co-operative Society), a member of the executive committee of the Kerala State Library Council, a director board member of the Sahithya Pravarthaka Co-operative Society, president of Ernakulam Public Library and editor-in-chief of the Granthalokam Magazine. From 1996 to 2001 he was the Additional Private Secretary in charge of the Kerala state Department of Culture under minister T. K. Ramakrishnan. He was a former member of the CPI (M) Ernakulam Area Committee.

He and his wife T. P. Lela had two daughters. He died at his residence in Pachalam, Ernakulam District on 13 January 2022, just a month before his 70th birthday.

Works
Shithila chitrangal
Enikkarodum pakayilla
Asthishayya
Kalushithakalam
Karutha Kurippukal
S. Ramesante Kavithakal
Mala Kayarunnavar
Hemanthathile Pakshi
Ee Thiruvasthram Njan Upekshikkukayanu
On The Unquiet Coast
Karutha Vavvalukal

Awards and honours
1999: Cherukad Award (Karutha Kurippukal)
2014: Abu Dhabi Sakthi Award - Poetry (Hemanthathile Pakshi) 
2015: Kerala Sahitya Akademi Award for Poetry (Hemanthathile Pakshi)
2019: Asan Memorial Poetry Prize
A. P. Kalakkad Award
Mooloor Award
Fokana Award

References

1952 births
2022 deaths
Malayalam-language writers
Writers from Kerala
People from Kottayam district
Indian male poets
Malayalam poets
Recipients of the Kerala Sahitya Akademi Award
Recipients of the Abu Dhabi Sakthi Award